is a railway station on the Iida Line in the city of Ina, Nagano Prefecture, Japan, operated by Central Japan Railway Company (JR Central).

Lines
Shimojima Station is served by the Iida Line and is 174.5 kilometers from the starting point of the line at Toyohashi Station.

Station layout
The station consists of one ground-level side platform serving a single bi-directional track. There is no station building, but only a shelter on the platform. The station is unattended.

Adjacent stations

History
Shimojima Station opened on 27 December 1913. With the privatization of Japanese National Railways (JNR) on 1 April 1987, the station came under the control of JR Central.

Passenger statistics
In fiscal 2015, the station was used by an average of 63 passengers daily (boarding passengers only).

Surrounding area

Tenryū River

See also
 List of railway stations in Japan

References

External links
 Shimojima Station information 

Railway stations in Nagano Prefecture
Railway stations in Japan opened in 1913
Stations of Central Japan Railway Company
Iida Line
Ina, Nagano